Olga Oelkers (21 May 1887 – 10 January 1969) was a German foil fencer. She competed at the 1928 and 1936 Olympics and won a bronze medal in 1928, behind her teammate Helene Mayer who won gold. 
At the European championships Oelkers won a team gold medal in 1936, a silver in 1934, and a bronze in 1935. After retiring from fencing Oelkers became a housewife and raised five children.

References

1887 births
1969 deaths
German female fencers
Olympic fencers of Germany
Fencers at the 1928 Summer Olympics
Fencers at the 1936 Summer Olympics
Olympic bronze medalists for Germany
Fencers from Berlin
Olympic medalists in fencing
Medalists at the 1928 Summer Olympics
20th-century German women